The Wiltz International Scout Centre is situated in Wiltz, in northwestern Luxembourg. During the camping season, it hosts 80,000 Scouts a year from all over the world. The Scout Centre is not a single building but  nine chalets and seven campsites surrounding the town.

The Scout Centre is run by the local group of the Lëtzebuerger Guiden a Scouten.

See also 

Gilwell Park
Larch Hill
Kandersteg International Scout Centre
Our Chalet

References

External links
 Official Homepage
 Map of campgrounds 

Buildings and structures in Wiltz
Scout campsites
Scouting and Guiding in Luxembourg
Outdoor structures in Luxembourg